Fuzz is a 1972 American action comedy film directed by Richard A. Colla and starring Burt Reynolds, Yul Brynner, Raquel Welch, Tom Skerritt and Jack Weston.

The screenplay was written by Evan Hunter based on the 1968 novel of the same name that is part of his 87th Precinct written under the pen name Ed McBain. Dave Grusin composed the film's soundtrack score. Noted illustrator Richard Amsel painted the poster artwork, featuring Reynolds in a reclining pose reminiscent of his famous centerfold in Cosmopolitan magazine appearing earlier that year.

Although the 87th Precinct novels are set in a fictional metropolis based on New York City, Fuzz is set in, and was shot on location in, Boston, Massachusetts.

Plot
Detectives Steve Carella, Meyer Meyer, Eileen McHenry and Bert Kling of the 87th Precinct investigate a murder-extortion racket run by a mysterious deaf man. They must also follow a string of robberies. Further complicating matters is a rash of arson attacks on homeless men.

Cast
 Burt Reynolds as Detective Carella
 Raquel Welch as Detective McHenry
 Yul Brynner as The Deaf Man
 Tom Skerritt as Detective Kling
 Jack Weston as Detective Meyer
 James McEachin as Detective Brown
 Bert Remsen as Sergeant Murchison
 Steve Ihnat as Detective Parker
 Peter Bonerz as Buck
 Don Gordon as La Bresca
 Dan Frazer as Lieutenant Amos Byrnes
 Norman Burton as Police Commissioner Nelson
 Vince Howard as Patrolman Marshall
 Brian Doyle-Murray as Detective
 Charles Tyner as Pete
 Neile Adams as Teddy
 Tamara Dobson as Rochelle
 Charles Martin Smith as "Baby"
 Robert Jaffe as Alan Parry

Production
The film's opening-credits sequence was filmed in and around Charlestown's City Square station on the Massachusetts Bay Transportation Authority's elevated Orange Line (demolished in 1975), as well as the Red Line as it emerges from its Cambridge tunnel to cross the Longfellow Bridge en route into Boston. Other Boston filming locations include the North End, the Boston Common and the Public Garden, where Burt Reynolds is disguised as a nun.

Reynolds recalled: "It was kind of fuzzy. It was made by one of those hot shot TV directors. I liked working with Jack Weston; it began our relationship. I did like working again with Raquel. And I liked the writer whose book the film was based on, Ed McBain, The 87th Precinct. I'd like to direct one of his books."

Welch was paid $100,000 for nine days of work. There was a scene in which Welch's character appears in her bra and panties in the men's room, but Welch initially refused to appear in it. Despite attempting alternate shoots, producer Ed Feldman said that "it just didn't work. ... We promised United Artists we'd deliver a certain picture and we haven't got it."

Reception
Roger Ebert awarded the film three stars out of four and called it "an offbeat, funny, quietly cheerful movie in which Ed McBain's 87th Precinct is finally brought to life. Several movies have been based on McBain's 87th Precinct novels, but never one in which the squad room was explored so lovingly by the camera, and the detectives were made so human."

In a negative review for The New York Times, Vincent Canby remarked that the film "looks more like a dress rehearsal than a finished film, a very dry run for something that is apparently meant to be a comedy-melodrama about ineptitude, especially the day-to-day ineptitude of a group of detectives attached to a Boston police station."

Arthur D. Murphy of Variety praised the screenplay as "excellent" and "a rare combination of effective interlocking vignettes which logically and literately evolve towards a climax." Of the performances, Murphy wrote, "Reynolds is very good, Weston and James McEachin are excellent, and Skerritt is outstanding as the principal quartet of detectives spotlighted in the hunt for Brynner. Miss Welch's developed cameo as a sexy policewoman is a decided plus."

Gene Siskel of the Chicago Tribune awarded the film three stars out of four and wrote that it has "something for everyone: Raquel Welch and Burt Reynolds. Only a solve-three-plots-at-once ending spoils the entertainment."

Kevin Thomas of the Los Angeles Times declared the film "a solid piece of craftsmanship, well-paced and skilfully assembled," although he felt that it "could have been just as diverting had it been played less broadly and for more in-depth characterization. As it is, 'Fuzz' succeeds as a mindless entertainment."

Gary Arnold of The Washington Post called the film "a sprightly, genial take-off on the cops-and-robbers formula" as well as "the most amusing and attractive commercial vehicle I've seen since 'Play It Again, Sam,' and it recommends itself in a similar way — as an agreeable throwaway entertainment, ideally suited for summertime moviegoing."

Tony Collier of The Monthly Film Bulletin thought that "the comedy here, ladled on with a satirical fervour that invites overstatement, works in isolation, with no real interplay between it and the violence, so that the two elements coexist without ever quite managing to coalesce. Fuzz is nevertheless an intelligent and enjoyable film, and often very funny."

Controversy
In Boston on October 2, 1973, 24-year-old white woman Evelyn Wagler was walking to her car with a two-gallon can of gasoline. Six black teenagers dragged her into an alley and forced her to pour gasoline on herself. She complied and was then set ablaze by the teenagers, who walked away laughing. The hate crime occurred during a racially tense period in Boston. After the incident, the press reported that Fuzz had aired on nationwide television the previous weekend and that the perpetrators may have reenacted an attack portrayed in the movie. The case was never solved.

In Miami on October 20, 1973, 38-year-old Charles Scales, a homeless person sleeping outdoors behind an abandoned building, was approached by a group of teenagers, doused with gasoline and set on fire. Two other homeless people were also attacked in the same incident but escaped. A survivor stated the teenagers "were laughing and throwing gas and striking matches" at them. The film was mentioned in news reports about the murder, as the attack closely one of its scenes. This murder did not appear to have been racially motivated.

The incidents led to a careful review by network television Standards and Practices departments and a general feeling among the public that television violence was inspiring real-life acts of violence. Networks were forced curb the amount of violence that they broadcast throughout the decade, and Fuzz was temporarily withdrawn from television broadcast until it returned to cable television years later.

See also
 List of American films of 1972

References

External links
 
 
 
 
 

1972 films
1970s English-language films
American action comedy films
American buddy cop films
Fictional portrayals of the Boston Police Department
Films scored by Dave Grusin
Films based on novels by Ed McBain
Films set in Boston
Films shot in Boston
American police detective films
United Artists films
Films directed by Richard A. Colla
Films with screenplays by Evan Hunter
1970s police comedy films
1970s action comedy films
American action adventure films
Filmways films
1972 comedy films
1970s American films